The Kittatinny Mountain Tunnel is a tunnel through Kittatinny Mountain in Franklin County, Pennsylvania. It is one of seven tunnels completed for the Pennsylvania Turnpike, and one of four still in use today.

Popular culture
The Kittatinny Mountain Tunnel's western portal is featured on the first postcard during the opening sequence of National Lampoon's Vacation.

References

External links

Map: 

Toll tunnels in Pennsylvania
Transportation buildings and structures in Franklin County, Pennsylvania
Pennsylvania Turnpike Commission
Road tunnels in Pennsylvania